James (Jamie) Ellis is a British record producer and mixer who previously played guitar with the indie rock group, Battle.  He is the son of the journalist and author, Walter Ellis.

He has worked with The 1975, The Rifles, Nolwenn Leroy, Chapel Club, Jordan Mackampa, Veronica Fusaro and many others.

He started his production career by assisting on records including Florence and the Machine's Lungs, Plan B's The Defamation Of Strickland Banks, Jack Peñate's Everything Is New, Chapel Club's Palace and others.

General references
 Ellis, Walter (2006). The Beginning of the End:  The Crippling Disadvantage of a Happy Irish Childhood, Mainstream Publishing

British male guitarists
British record producers
Living people
Year of birth missing (living people)